Lycian is a Unicode block containing characters for writing the ancient Lycian language in Anatolia.

History
The following Unicode-related documents record the purpose and process of defining specific characters in the Lycian block:

References 

Unicode blocks